Liz Howard is a Canadian writer. Her debut poetry collection, Infinite Citizen of the Shaking Tent, was a shortlisted nominee for the Governor General's Award for English-language poetry at the 2015 Governor General's Awards, and winner of the 2016 Griffin Poetry Prize.

Originally from Northern Ontario, Howard is of Anishinaabe descent. She studied cognitive neuroscience at the University of Toronto.

Works

See also

Canadian literature
Canadian poetry
List of Canadian poets

References

External links 
Biography, poetry excerpts from Griffin Poetry Prize website

21st-century Canadian poets
Canadian women poets
First Nations poets
First Nations women writers
Writers from Ontario
University of Toronto alumni
Living people
21st-century Canadian women writers
21st-century First Nations writers
Year of birth missing (living people)